The Iași Open is a professional tennis tournament played on clay courts. It is currently part of the ATP Challenger Tour and WTA 125 tournaments. It is held annually in Iași, Romania since 2020.

Past finals

Men's singles

Women's singles

Men's doubles

Women's doubles

References

ATP Challenger Tour
Clay court tennis tournaments
Tennis tournaments in Romania
Iași
Recurring sporting events established in 2020